Camden, Calvert and King was an eighteenth-century partnership that traded in London from 1760 to 1824, transporting slaves and later convicts.

Activities
The partners owned whalers, merchant vessels trading to the East and West Indies, slave ships, and vessels transporting convicts to Australia.

The partners became involved in the transportation of English convicts first to America and later to Australia.

They were the largest company in London involved in the triangular trade in enslaved people. After the British Parliament passed an Act for the abolition of the slave trade in 1807, the company continued to put its know-how in transporting people to work transporting convicts to Australia.

The principal partners were William Camden (173? - 1796), Anthony Calvert (1735-1809) and Thomas King (1735? – 1824).

Addresses
12 Red Lion Street, Wapping
Limehouse Shipyard
The Crescent and 14 America Square, Minories
24 Burr Street, Wapping
Alie (Ayliffe) Street, Aldgate

Vessels

Salamander

Citations

References
 
 

English slave traders